Laserpitium latifolium, common name broad-leaved sermountain, is an herbaceous perennial plant in the genus Laserpitium of the family Apiaceae.

Description
 Laserpitium latifolium reaches on average  of height. The stem is green-grayish, round, erect and lightly grooved, branched on the top. Leaves are quite large, biternate and petiolated, with a prominent central rib. Leaflets are ovate or heart-shaped and toothed. The leaves are 3–10 cm long and 2–6 cm wide. Flowers are white, clustered in unbrels of 25–40 rays. The diameter of umbels reaches . The flowering season is from May to August.

Distribution
It is widespread in most of Europe except Albania, Great Britain, Greece, Ireland, the Netherlands and Portugal. It has been introduced in Belgium.

Habitat
It grows in mountain dry forests, on grassy slopes, on the sunny edges of woods or in meadows.

Gallery

References

 Pignatti S. - Flora d'Italia - Edagricole – 1982
 Tutin, T.G. et al. - Flora Europaea, second edition - 1993

External links

 Biolib
 Laserpitium latifolium
 Laserpitium latifolium

Apioideae
Plants described in 1753
Taxa named by Carl Linnaeus